The 2020 Wisconsin Democratic presidential primary took place on April 7, 2020, in the midst of the global COVID-19 pandemic, along with the Wisconsin Supreme Court Justice election, as part of the Democratic Party primaries for the 2020 presidential election. The Wisconsin primary was an open primary, with the state awarding 97 delegates to the 2020 Democratic National Convention, of which 84 were pledged delegates allocated on the basis of the results of the primary. Although all forms of voting had to take place on or until April 7, full results were not allowed to be released before April 13, in accordance with a district court ruling.

As of the primary on April 7, former vice president Joe Biden and senator Bernie Sanders were the only candidates left in the race. Even though results were only released six days later, Sanders dropped out and suspended his campaign the next morning (after he had already heavily scaled it back and focused on the treatment of the pandemic crisis), leaving Biden as the party's presumed presidential nominee. Nevertheless, Sanders declared that he wanted to continue competing for delegates at the national convention in subsequent primaries. Biden had ultimately won the primary with around 63% of the vote and 56 delegates, while Sanders, who had previously won Wisconsin in the 2016 primaries, only received around 32% of the vote and 28 delegates.

Procedure
Wisconsin was the only state that voted on April 7, 2020 in the Democratic primaries. The primary followed seven original primary dates between March 17 and April 4 which had been cancelled and postponed due to the COVID-19 pandemic. Voting took place throughout the state from 7:00 a.m. until 8:00 p.m. In the open primary, candidates had to meet a threshold of 15% at the congressional district or statewide level in order to be considered viable. The 84 pledged delegates to the 2020 Democratic National Convention were allocated proportionally on the basis of the results of the primary. Of these, between 5 and 11 were allocated to each of the state's 8 congressional districts and another 10 were allocated to party leaders and elected officials (PLEO delegates), in addition to 19 at-large delegates. Originally planned with 77 delegates, the final number included a 10% bonus of 7 additional delegates on the 55 district and 19 at-large delegates by the Democratic National Committee due to the April date, which belonged to Stage II on the primary timetable.

On April 26, 2020, county caucuses selected delegates for congressional district caucuses, which took place on May 17, 2020, designating national convention district-level delegates. The administrative committee meeting was subsequently held on the day of the state convention on June 12, 2020, to vote on the 19 at-large and 10 pledged PLEO delegates for the Democratic National Convention. The delegation also included 13 unpledged PLEO delegates: 8 members of the Democratic National Committee, 4 members of Congress (one senator and 3 representatives), and the governor Tony Evers.

COVID-19 pandemic

Since the outbreak of the COVID-19 pandemic, several states had delayed their scheduled primaries and extended the vote-by-mail period. Concerns were raised by health officials, poll workers, and voters that in-person voting at the height of the pandemic would be unsafe for vulnerable individuals. Democratic Governor Tony Evers initially signed an executive order for all-mail-in election, but the order was rejected by the Republican-controlled Wisconsin Legislature.

On April 2, although U.S. District Judge William M. Conley refused to postpone the election, he extended the deadline for absentee voting to April 13 (ordering clerks not to release any election data before that date). However, on April 6, the Supreme Court of the United States overturned Conley's decision, meaning that all absentee ballots still had to be postmarked by "election day, Tuesday, April 7" even though it was still acceptable for the ballots to be received by the clerks as late as April 13. The Supreme Court of the United States "did not alter the provision in Conley's amended order which prohibits the reporting of results until April 13".

Governor Evers then called a special session of the legislature to postpone in-person voting, but the session ended within minutes without action, forcing the primary to go on as planned. Despite having previously expressed the view that he would violate the law by doing so, on April 6, Evers issued an executive order which, if enforced, would have postponed the April 7 elections until the tentative date of June 9. Republican leaders immediately announced that they would challenge the order in the Wisconsin Supreme Court. The Wisconsin Supreme Court ruled that Evers did not have the authority to postpone the elections, thus meaning that Evers' executive order was nullified, and that the elections would be held as scheduled on April 7. This was appealed to a federal court who sided with the governor, and that was appealed to the US Supreme Court, which on a 5–4 vote, upheld the state court's ruling.

Voting was somewhat chaotic, with people waiting in the rain for hours in some cases in masks and social distancing. However, by the time the election concluded, Milwaukee Election Commissioner Neil Albrecht stated that despite some of the problems, the in-person voting ran smoothly.

Candidates
The following individuals were on the ballot in Wisconsin:

Running

Joe Biden
Bernie Sanders

Withdrawn

Michael Bennet
Michael Bloomberg
Pete Buttigieg
John Delaney
Tulsi Gabbard
Amy Klobuchar
Deval Patrick
Tom Steyer
Elizabeth Warren
Andrew Yang

Polling

Results

See also
Impact of the 2019–20 coronavirus pandemic on politics
2020 Wisconsin elections
2020 Wisconsin Republican primary

Notes

References

External links
The Green Papers delegate allocation summary
FiveThirtyEight Wisconsin primary poll tracker
ScotusBlog

Wisconsin Democratic
Democratic primary
2020